Yelogu, also known as Kaunga, is one of the Ndu languages of Sepik River region of northern Papua New Guinea. It is spoken in Yelogu village, Bangus ward, Ambunti Rural LLG, East Sepik Province.

References

Languages of East Sepik Province
Ndu languages